Shivdasani is an Indian (Sindhi) surname. It may refer to:

Aftab Shivdasani (born 1978), Indian actor
Babita Shivdasani (born 1947), Indian actress
Deepak Shivdasani (fl. 1982–2017), Indian film director and producer of Bollywood
Hari Shivdasani (1909–1994), Indian character actor
Jaggy Shivdasani (born 1958), Indian bridge player
Sadhana Shivdasani (1941–2015), Indian actress

Indian surnames
Surnames of Indian origin
Sindhi-language surnames
Hindu surnames